The women's 10,000 metres at the 2009 World Championships in Athletics was held at the Olympic Stadium on 15 August. The Ethiopian team was particularly strong in the event, with two-time World Champion Tirunesh Dibaba, 5000 metres World Champion Meseret Defar, and African record holder Meselech Melkamu all vying for first place. The 2007 silver medallist Elvan Abeylegesse, Olympic bronze medallist Shalane Flanagan, and the World Cross Country Champion Florence Kiplagat were other athletes with strong medal possibilities.

The race featured a number of surprises and upsets, beginning with the withdrawal of the defending champion Dibaba due to a leg injury, replaced by Wude Ayalew. The race started awkwardly when the outer alley of the starting group, led by Florence Kiplagat, broke to the inside at the gun.  Essentially Masai, Ayalew, Grace Momanyi and the other five runners on the outside who followed Kiplagat ran a course some 14 meters shorter than the twelve runners from the other larger alley.  But confused officials did not recall the start or issue any disqualifications for the incident.  Still, Inês Monteiro took the early lead with the outer runners falling in behind her.  By the end of the first lap Yukari Sahaku and Yurika Nakamura had emerged as the pacesetters.  After a kilometer, the Russian duo of Liliya Shobukhova and Mariya Konovalova took the lead.  Konovalova held the point, marked by Nakamura at an even, leisurely pace for this crowd until just after eight laps to go when Linet Masai, who had been hanging around the back of the tight pack made a quick move to the front.  All three Ethiopians rushed to mark the move.  By the end of the lap, 2007 medallist Abeylegesse dropped out of the race and a quintet of runners ( Masai, Melkamu, Defar, Ayalew and Grace Momanyi) had broken away from the rest of the pack. Lap times dropped from the 75 second average to 71, to 69.  But Masai's pace slowed back to 70 then 71.  Momanyi came up to take the lead with the Ethiopians changing their focus though Ayalew was struggling to keep on the back behind Masai.  After taking the break for a lap, Masai returned to take the lead.  As the runners approached the finish line for the bell, favourites Defar and Melkamu sprinted in front. Defar held the lead through the final turn, with Melkamu boxing Masai, neither could completely break away.  With clear running room coming off the turn, Masai tried to get her long legs going.   She wasn't able to make much progress, nor could Melkamu pass her teammate until Defar began to fade, unable to maintain her speed.   Melkamu took the lead.   14 meters out, Masai passed Melkamu.  Perhaps not noticing, Melkamu prematurely celebrated but Masai was a meter ahead to take the gold medal with a tactically-timed run. Defar, completely exhausted, eventually finished in fifth as Ayalew sprinted past Momanyi to take the bronze.

Breaking a decade of Ethiopian dominance, nineteen-year-old Masai's gold medal was the first Kenyan victory in the event since the 1997 World Championships, and the country's first 10,000 m medal since 1999.

Medalists

Records

Qualification standards

Schedule

Results

Key: PB = Personal best, SB = Seasonal best

Splits

References
General
10,000 metres results from IAAF. IAAF. Retrieved on 2009-08-15.
Specific

10,000 metres
10,000 metres at the World Athletics Championships
2009 in women's athletics